Thyone is a genus of sea cucumbers in the family Phyllophoridae.

Species 
The following species are accepted in the genus Thyone:

 Thyone adinopoda , 1981
 Thyone andrewsii (1860)
 Thyone anomala , 1898
 Thyone aurea (1834)
 Thyone avenusta , 1970
 Thyone axiologa , 1938
 Thyone bacescoi , 1972
 Thyone benti , 1937
 Thyone bicornis , 1915
 Thyone bidentata , 1941
 Thyone brasiliana Prata, Manso & Christoffersen, 2020
 Thyone carens , 1988
 Thyone cherbonnieri , 1959
 Thyone comata , 1988
 Thyone crassidisca , 1981
 Thyone crebrapodia , 1988
 Thyone curvata , 1885
 Thyone deichmannae , 1941
 Thyone discolor , 1901
 Thyone dura , 1908
 Thyone flindersi , 2012
 Thyone florianoi Martins & Tavares, 2018
 Thyone fusca , 1903
 Thyone fusus (1776) - type species (as Holothuria fusus Müller, 1776)
 Thyone gadeana , 1898
 Thyone grisea , 1938
 Thyone guillei , 1988
 Thyone herberti , 1999
 Thyone hirta , 1970
 Thyone imperfecta (1970)
 Thyone inermis , 1868
 Thyone infusca , 1954
 Thyone joshuai , 2012
 Thyone kerkosa , 2012
 Thyone longicornis , 1988
 Thyone micra , 1938
 Thyone montoucheti , 1971
 Thyone neofusus , 1941
 Thyone nigra , 1915
 Thyone okeni , 1884
 Thyone papuensis , 1886
 Thyone parafusus , 1941
 Thyone pawsoni , 1972
 Thyone pedata , 1867
 Thyone pohaiensis , 1986
 Thyone polybranchia , 1898
 Thyone profusus , 1981
 Thyone propinqua , 1970
 Thyone pseudofusus , 1930
 Thyone purpureopunctata , 2001
 Thyone quadruperforata , 1954
 Thyone roscovita , 1889
 Thyone sinensis , 2001
 Thyone sineturra , 1988
 Thyone spenceri , 2012
 Thyone spinifera , 1995
 Thyone strangeri , 1941
 Thyone susamiensis , 2015
 Thyone tanyspiera , 1988
 Thyone theeli , 1995
 Thyone tourvillei , 2012
 Thyone vadosa , 1988
 Thyone venusta , 1868
 Thyone venustella , 1935
 Thyone villosa , 1867
 Thyone vitrea , 1901
 Thyone waltinhoi Martins & Souto, 2018

References

External links

Holothuroidea genera
Taxa named by Lorenz Oken
Phyllophoridae